Taipei International Christian Academy (TICA) is an International American Curriculum School Cooperative for parents and students in Taipei.  TICA's educational program is Christ centered, project based, authentic service focused, and inclusive of students with special needs. Its website is now closed, so presumably the school is as well.

History 
Taipei International Christian Academy was started in 2011 as  a new educational program in Taipei as an alternative to the other existing international/foreign schools. TICA has one of the very few English special education programs in Asia.

See also International Schools in Taipei                                                                                                                    

 Taipei American School
 Taipei European School
 Dominican International School
 Morrison Academy
 Kaohsiung American School
 Taipei Adventist American School
 The Primacy Collegiate Academy
 Taipei Japanese School
 Pacific American School

References

External links 
 
Official Facebook

2011 establishments in Taiwan
International schools in Taipei
Educational institutions established in 2011
American international schools in Taiwan
Nondenominational Christian schools
Christian schools in Taiwan
Primary schools in Taiwan